Queen Camel is a village and civil parish, on the River Cam and the A359 road, in the South Somerset district of Somerset, England. According to the 2011 census it had a population of 908. The parish includes the hamlet of Wales. Nearby places are West Camel, Sparkford and Marston Magna.

History

The site of a Romano-British settlement has been identified south west of Camel Hill Farm, which was occupied in the 2nd to 4th centuries. Stone foundations of at least three buildings have been identified.
The name "Camel" derives not from the animal but from "cantmael", the name of the place in the 10th century. "Cantmael" possibly derives from the Celtic words canto "district" and mael "bare hill" The "Queen" in the village's name is probably Queen Eleanor, the wife of Henry III, who owned land in the area in the 13th century.

Some historians, including John Leland, believe the area surrounding the village to be the site of the final battle of King Arthur, the Battle of Camlann.

In the 10th century, land in Camel was granted away by the kings Edmund I, Eadwig and Edgar the Peaceful, but by the time of the Norman Conquest in 1066 it was held by Gytha of Wessex, after whom the village school, which opened in 1873 is named. In 1202 the manor was granted to Hubert de Burgh, by King John, who gave it to the monks of Cleeve Abbey. It later returned to the crown and in 1275 was known as Camel Regis. In 1558 it was granted to Sir Walter Mildmay, whose family retained it until 1929.

The parish was part of the hundred of Catsash.

The Mildmay family lived at Hazlegrove House, a substantial 17th-century house which was largely rebuilt by Carew Mildmay in 1730. It later became Hazlegrove Preparatory School, the junior school of King's School, Bruton.

A fire in 1634 destroyed 70 properties in the village.

Governance
The parish council has responsibility for local issues, including setting an annual precept (local rate) to cover the council's operating costs and producing annual accounts for public scrutiny. The parish council evaluates local planning applications and works with the local police, district council officers, and neighbourhood watch groups on matters of crime, security, and traffic. The parish council's role also includes initiating projects for the maintenance and repair of parish facilities, as well as consulting with the district council on the maintenance, repair, and improvement of highways, drainage, footpaths, public transport, and street cleaning. Conservation matters (including trees and listed buildings) and environmental issues are also the responsibility of the council.

The village falls within the non-metropolitan district of South Somerset, which was formed on 1 April 1974 under the Local Government Act 1972, having previously been part of Wincanton Rural District. The district council is responsible for local planning and building control, local roads, council housing, environmental health, markets and fairs, refuse collection and recycling, cemeteries and crematoria, leisure services, parks, and tourism.

Queen Camel is part of the electoral ward of Camelot. This ward stretches from Sparkford in the north east through Marston Magna to Rimpton in the south. The total population of the ward as at the 2011 census was 2,742.

Somerset County Council is responsible for running the largest and most expensive local services such as education, social services, libraries, main roads, public transport, policing and fire services, trading standards, waste disposal and strategic planning.

It is also part of the Somerton and Frome county constituency represented in the House of Commons of the Parliament of the United Kingdom. It elects one Member of Parliament (MP) by the first past the post system of election.

Landmarks

The Wales and Camel Bridges over the River Cam date from the 18th century, although one may be a rebuilding of an older packhorse bridge.

The 17th-century Wales farmhouse and a row of 15th-century cottages are near the Wales bridge.
There is one shop that provides all of the villages needs. 

Queen Camel is also home to Ridge Pottery which was established in the village in 1977. It is an all woodfired pottery studio run by Douglas and Jennie Phillips which specializes in educational courses and workshops, as well as making their own pieces for sale.

Religious sites
The Church of St Barnabas, reached from a cobbled lane, has a lofty tower, built in five stages. The church houses the second heaviest set of six bells in Europe. The Anglican parish church dates from the 14th century with the first recorded rector being in 1317. It contains memorials to many of the Mildmay family. It has been designated as a Grade I listed building.

References

External links

Official Parish Council Website

Villages in South Somerset
Civil parishes in Somerset